1100 Arnica , provisional designation , is a Koronian asteroid from the outer regions of the asteroid belt, approximately 17 kilometers in diameter. It was discovered by Karl Reinmuth at the Heidelberg Observatory in 1928 and named after the herbaceous plant Arnica (aster; daisy). The asteroid is likely of stony composition and has a rotation period of 14.535 hours.

Discovery 

It was officially discovered on 22 September 1928, by German astronomer Karl Reinmuth at Heidelberg in southwest Germany. On 14 October 1928, it was independently discovered by astronomers Friedrich Schwassmann and Arthur Wachmann at the Bergedorf Observatory in Hamburg. The Minor Planet Center does not recognize these independent discoverers.

Orbit and classification 

Arnica is a member of the Koronis family, an  outer belt asteroid family with nearly co-planar ecliptical orbits. The family consist of nearly 6,000 known members and is named after its parent body 158 Koronis.

It orbits the Sun in the outer asteroid belt at a distance of 2.7–3.1 AU once every 4 years and 11 months (1,803 days; semi-major axis of 2.90 AU). Its orbit has an eccentricity of 0.07 and an inclination of 1° with respect to the ecliptic. The body's observation arc begins at Heidelberg in October 1918, almost 10 years prior to its official discovery observation.

Close asteroid approaches 

Arnica occasionally makes close approaches to other main-belt asteroids. It will pass close to 88 Thisbe three times before the year 2200. On 21 February 2043, Arnica will be  from Thisbe. On 31 March 2112, it will be  from Thisbe. Its closest approach to Thisbe will occur on 17 May 2181, when its distance to Thisbe will be .

Physical characteristics 

Arnica is an assumed stony S-type asteroid, which is also the overall spectral type for members of the Koronis family.

Rotation period 

Several rotational lightcurves of Arnica have been obtained from photometric observations since 2003. Analysis of the best-rated lightcurve gave a rotation period of 14.535 hours with a consolidated brightness amplitude between 0.09 and 0.28 magnitude.

Diameter and albedo 

According to the survey carried out by the NEOWISE mission of NASA's Wide-field Infrared Survey Explorer, Arnica measures 16.894 and 17.234 kilometers in diameter and its surface has an albedo of 0.246 and 0.2389, respectively. The Collaborative Asteroid Lightcurve Link assumes a stony standard albedo for Koronian asteroids of 0.24 and calculates a diameter of 17.92 kilometers based on an absolute magnitude of 10.9.

Naming 

This minor planet was named after Arnica, a genus of flowering plants in the sunflower family (aster, daisy, composite). The official naming citation was mentioned in The Names of the Minor Planets by Paul Herget in 1955.

Reinmuth's flowers 

Due to his many discoveries, Karl Reinmuth submitted a large list of 66 newly named asteroids in the early 1930s. This list also contained a sequence of 28 asteroids, starting with 1054 Forsytia, that were all named after plants, in particular flowering plants (also see list of minor planets named after animals and plants).

References

External links 
 Asteroid Lightcurve Database (LCDB), query form (info )
 Dictionary of Minor Planet Names, Google books
 Asteroids and comets rotation curves, CdR – Observatoire de Genève, Raoul Behrend
 Discovery Circumstances: Numbered Minor Planets (1)-(5000) – Minor Planet Center
 
 

001100
Discoveries by Karl Wilhelm Reinmuth
Named minor planets
19280922